Girisopam (GYKI-51189,  EGIS-5810) is a drug which is a 2,3-benzodiazepine derivative, related to tofisopam and zometapine. It has selective anxiolytic action with no sedative, anticonvulsant or muscle relaxant effects.

Synthesis 

Henry reaction between Veratraldehyde [120-14-9] (1) and nitroethane gives 1,2-Dimethoxy-4-(2-nitropropenyl)benzene [122-47-4] (2). Treatment with iron and muriatic acid in the presence of iron trichloride catalyst gives 3,4-Dimethoxyphenylacetone [776-99-8] (3). The reduction of the ketone with sodium borohydride gives 1-(3,4-Dimethoxyphenyl)-2-propanol [19578-92-8] (4). Treatment with formaldehyde in acid gives 6,7-dimethoxy-3-methyl-1H-isochromene, CID:57074411 (5). Oxidation by chromium trichloride gives 3-Methyl-6,7-Dimethoxyisocoumarin, CID:12349213 (6). Grignard reaction with 1-Bromo-3-Chlorobenzene [108-37-2] (7) gives (8). Treatment with Perchloric acid leads to 1-(3-chlorophenyl)-3-methyl 6,7-dimethoxy-2-benzopyrylium perchlorate CID:14502385 (9).

 The reaction between (9) and hydrazine hydrate (10) in methanol solvent gives girisopam (11).

See also 
 Benzodiazepine

References 

Benzodiazepines
Chlorobenzenes
Phenol ethers